Brandon Johnson (born April 5, 1983) is a former American football linebacker. He was drafted by the Arizona Cardinals in the fifth round of the 2006 NFL Draft and played for the Cincinnati Bengals. He played college football at Louisville.  He is the co-founder with his wife of Johnson Family Foundation.

References

External links
Arizona Cardinals bio
Cincinnati Bengals bio
Louisville Cardinals bio
Johnson Family Foundation

1983 births
Living people
American football linebackers
Arizona Cardinals players
Cincinnati Bengals players
Louisville Cardinals football players
Pittsburgh Steelers players
Players of American football from Birmingham, Alabama
People from Adamsville, Alabama